There have been three baronetcies created for persons with the surname Lever, all in the Baronetage of the United Kingdom.

The Lever Baronetcy, of Hans Crescent in Chelsea, was created in the Baronetage of the United Kingdom on 8 February 1911 for the Liberal politician Arthur Lever. Born Arthur Levy, he assumed the surname of Lever in lieu of Levy by deed poll in 1896 and by Royal licence in 1911. The second Baronet was an author of historical works such as The Life and Times of Sir Robert Peel (1942) and The House of Pitt (1947). The third Baronet was a writer on nature and wildlife. The baronetcy became extinct upon the death of the 3rd baronet in 2021.

Maurice Levy, elder brother of the first Baronet, was created a baronet in 1913 (see Levy baronets).

The Lever Baronetcy, of Thornton Manor, was created in the Baronetage of the United Kingdom on 6 July 1911. For more information on this creation, see the Viscount Leverhulme.

The Lever Baronetcy, of Allerton in the County of Lancaster, was created in the Baronetage of the United Kingdom on 3 February 1920 for the accountant and civil servant Hardman Lever. The title became extinct on his death in 1947.

Lever baronets, of Hans Crescent (1911)
Sir Arthur Levy Lever, 1st Baronet (1860–1924)
Sir Tresham Joseph Philip Lever, 2nd Baronet (1900–1975)
Sir (Tresham) Christopher Arthur Lindsay Lever, 3rd Baronet (1932–2021)

Lever baronets, of Thornton Manor (1911)
see the Viscount Leverhulme

Lever baronets, of Allerton (1920)
Sir Samuel Hardman Lever, 1st Baronet (1869–1947)

References

Sources
Kidd, Charles, Williamson, David (editors). Debrett's Peerage and Baronetage (1990 edition). New York: St Martin's Press, 1990.

Baronetcies in the Baronetage of the United Kingdom
Extinct baronetcies in the Baronetage of the United Kingdom